Swimming was contested from September 30 to October 5 at the 2002 Asian Games in Busan, South Korea.

Schedule

Medalists

Men

Women

Medal table

Participating nations
A total of 220 athletes from 28 nations competed in swimming at the 2002 Asian Games:

References 
 Channelnewsasia.com: Asian Games
 Japan's Kitajima Breaks Barrowman's 200m Breaststroke World Record; Cracks 2:10 Barrier

External links 
 14th Asian Games Busan 2002

 
2002 Asian Games events
2002
Asian Games
2002 Asian Games
International aquatics competitions hosted by South Korea